"Each Moment (Spent With You)" was a country song written by Billy Hogan. It was a top 5 hit in the US for Ernie Ashworth in 1960.

Chart performance

References

1960 singles
Ernest Ashworth songs
1960 songs
Decca Records singles